The 2009 Copa Petrobras Asunción was a professional tennis tournament played on outdoor red clay courts. It was the fourth edition of the tournament which was part of the 2009 ATP Challenger Tour. It took place in Asunción, Paraguay between 12 and 18 October 2009.

Singles main draw entrants

Seeds

 Rankings are as of October 5, 2009.

Other entrants
The following players received wildcards into the singles main draw:
  Ramón Delgado
  Diego Galeano
  Mariano Puerta
  Nicolás Salama

The following player received a Special Exempt into the singles main draw:
  Gastón Gaudio

The following players received entry from the qualifying draw:
  Facundo Bagnis
  Marcelo Demoliner
  Guido Pella
  Carles Poch-Gradin

Champions

Singles

 Ramón Delgado def.  Daniel Gimeno-Traver, 7–6(2), 1–6, 6–3

Doubles

 Rubén Ramírez Hidalgo /  Santiago Ventura def.  Máximo González /  Eduardo Schwank, 6–3, 0–6, [10–8]

External links
Copa Petrobras de Tênis website
ITF Search 
2009 Draws

Copa Petrobras Asuncion
Clay court tennis tournaments